Rolf-Dieter Arens (born 16 February 1945) is a German University professor and pianist. From 2001 to 2010 he was Rector of the Hochschule für Musik Franz Liszt, Weimar.

Life 
He received his first piano lessons at the age of five and completed his studies at the University of Music and Theatre Leipzig from 1963 to 1968 with H. Volger (piano) and L. Schuster (chamber music). From 1970 to 1986 he taught piano in Leipzig and Weimar, from 1986 until his retirement in 2011 he was full professor for piano at the Hochschule für Musik Franz Liszt in Weimar. 
In 1987 he served on the jury of the Paloma O'Shea Santander International Piano Competition.
From 1986 to 1991 he was a soloist with the Berlin Symphony Orchestra. In 1995 he founded the Kammermusikvereinigung Weimarer Solisten.
	
Arens has been President of the  since 2011.

Awards 
 1982: Art Prize of the German Democratic Republic
 2014: Order of Merit of the Free State of Thuringia

References

External links 
 
 

1945 births
Living people
People from Sächsische Schweiz-Osterzgebirge
20th-century German male classical pianists